Télécom SudParis  (formerly known as Télécom INT) is one of the top French engineering schools (public institutions) of higher education and research (French: Grandes Écoles) that award engineering degrees in France. It produces engineers with skills in information and telecommunication science and technology, and expertise in economic, social, and environmental fields.

Télécom SudParis shares its campus with Institut Mines-Telecom Business School (ex INT Management), a Graduate Business School, and has a research centre in the field of Information and Communication Science and Technology.

Télécom SudParis is part of Institut Mines-Télécom and Institut polytechnique de Paris. Télécom SudParis and Institut Mines-Telecom Business School are part of Telecom & Management SudParis (ex INT).



General Engineers

 Télécom SudParis trains general engineers ready to take up technological, economic and social challenges, capable of building their career plans or even starting up their own company. Their courses include early professional experience following several internships, a sense of teamwork and the know-how and human skills essential for their future activities.

Admission to engineering programs

Foreign students: Dual qualification with partner universities

Summer school
The European Summer School at Télécom SudParis offers students having completed at least two years of undergraduate studies an opportunity to study different aspects of either management, information technology or intercultural awareness in France.

Statistics
56% of the year’s student intake secured a job before graduating
89% of graduates secured a job within 4 months (5 weeks job-seeking on average)
More than 3,500 job offers received in the first semester of 2006
€35,000 gross salary, excluding bonus for new graduates.

Customized training programs
Télécom SudParis’s engineering programs consist of a common-core syllabus along with an advanced studies cycle, with each part lasting three semesters. They include solid business and international experience.

Research
 180 faculty staff
 140 PhD students
 Teaching and research departments:
Language and Human Science
Entrepreneurship, Management, Marketing and Strategy
Economics, Finance and Sociology
Information Systems
Advanced Research and Techniques for Multidimensional Imaging Systems (ARTEMIS)
Communications, Images and Information Analysis
Electronics and Physics
Computer science
Networks and Software
Networks and Multimedia mobile services
Telecommunications Networks

Research training
In the third year, openings in the field of research are available to students, as well as a range of Master of Science (MSc) and Research Master programs, awarded jointly with partner universities. Doctoral programs offer PhD students a broad spectrum of research themes on the school’s campus.

International environment
 40 partner universities
 10 dual qualification agreements
 60 nationalities on campus
 9 languages taught, including French as a foreign language
 30% of foreign students

Languages
In addition to English, which is compulsory, students must choose a second language: German, Spanish, Russian, Italian, Japanese, Arabic, Chinese and French as a foreign language. There is an option to learn a third language.

Studying abroad
The school has established multiple partnerships with more than forty universities located in 30 countries.
A number of options are available: lasting 1 to 3 semesters, to get an introduction to both culture and the country and obtain a dual qualification.

Campus
32% of professors and almost 400 students are foreign nationals. Altogether more than sixty nationalities are represented on the Telecom & Management SudParis campus, which is shared with the Business School: Telecom Business School. Foreign students are enrolled in graduate programs, doctoral programs, “Mastères Spécialisés” Programs (MS) or Master of Science.

Business presence
Business is a core component of Télécom SudParis’s educational programs: business start-ups, student placements, company visits, etc.

Expertise
Télécom SudParis offers a broad range of training programs at various levels: engineering training, specialized masters, PhD programs, lifelong learning programs such as BADGE (“Graduate School Aptitude Assessment”), accredited professional qualification programs. Télécom SudParis provides tailored support to companies, depending on their needs and development.

Business involvement
School life and the professional development of students are supported by corporate relationships: course involvement, sponsorship, career management assistance (T&M Alumni), project supervision or placements, student grants, etc.

Entrepreneurship support system 
Backed by the Essonne Regional Council, Télécom SudParis’s business incubator supports innovative project leaders in the ICT sector wishing to carry out their activities. Led by a team of experts, its entrepreneurship program is based on a broad range of services and resources: support, project engineering, incubation, information, advice, funding, communication, relational networks, etc.

Research development and transfer 
Research conducted at Télécom SudParis is primarily oriented towards application and industrial innovation, without losing sight of fundamental issues and problems. It is exploratory and pre-competitive in nature and is conducted in close cooperation with the national and international scientific community. Strong ties have been forged with SMEs, often thanks to the involvement of CRITT (Regional Centers for Innovation and Technology Transfer). Télécom SudParis offers businesses proven expertise in the field of ICT (Information and Communication Technologies) from a scientific and technical point of view and also in terms of management, services or usages.

The campus
Télécom SudParis is located in Évry, the main town in Essonne.

The majority of 1st and 2nd year students, as well as foreign students, live on campus, where 54 associations and clubs are managed by the student life Association

Around the campus
Cultural life is particularly dynamic around Évry, with the Agora Theater and the National Music Conservatory. It is also one of the greenest towns in France, with 220 hectares of green spaces, 6 parks and walks along river Seine. The town is very accessible, located 30 minutes from Paris and served by RER line D , bras de fer station is 5 minutes by walk and every center station is 10 minutes by walk and the A6 highway.

Gallery

References

External links
 Télécom SudParis (ex Télécom INT)
 Institut Mines-Telecom Business School (ex INT Management)

Engineering universities and colleges in France
Grandes écoles
Grands établissements
History of telecommunications in France
Universities in Île-de-France
Buildings and structures in Évry, Essonne
Education in Évry, Essonne
Telecommunication education